Theodor Martin Peter Ziesemer (26 May 1899 – 28 November 1961) was an Australian dairy farmer and wheat farmer. Ziesemer was born in Pittsworth, Queensland and died in Toowoomba, Queensland.

See also

References

Australian farmers
Australian people of German descent
1899 births
1961 deaths